Azamat Ruslanovich Merov (born 5 February 1989) is a former Russian football midfielder.

Club career
He played in the Russian Football National League for FC Angusht Nazran in 2013.

External links
 
 
 Profile by Sportbox

1989 births
Living people
Russian footballers
Association football midfielders
PFC Spartak Nalchik players
FC Angusht Nazran players